Saket Public School, Lanji is a Higher Secondary School situated in Lanji, Madhya Pradesh. It was established in July 2002, with the campus of the school situated in Ward No 12 Bhilai Road Lanji.

Background
School was established in 2002 through a small campus & some students. In July 2004 it shifted to Bhilai Road Lanji.

Facilities
Saket Public School Lanji provides primary,  middle & higher secondary school education in Hindi & English languages. Afflicted with Board of Secondary Education, Madhya Pradesh.

References

High schools and secondary schools in Madhya Pradesh
Balaghat district